Brian E. Linder (born January 24, 1972) is an American politician and a former Republican member of the Kentucky House of Representatives, who represented District 61 from 2013 to 2019.

Early life
Linder earned his bachelor's degree in economics, history, and political science from the University of Kentucky and his MBA from Thomas More College.

Career
2012 When District 61 Democratic Representative Royce Adams retired and left the seat open, Linder won the May 22, 2012 Republican Primary with 806 votes (52.9%) and won the November 6, 2012 General election with 9,387 votes (58.7%) against Democratic nominee Wanda Hammons.

Sexual harassment accusations
In November 2017, the Courier-Journal published a story revealing that House Speaker Jeff Hoover had reached a confidential settlement for a sexual harassment a female staff member had brought against four Congressmen. Linder later admitted to being involved in the settlement, and apologized for making unspecified "mistakes". He was subsequently replaced as the leader of the House Pension Committee.

References

External links
Official page at the Kentucky General Assembly

Brian E. Linder at Ballotpedia
Brian E. Linder at OpenSecrets

Place of birth missing (living people)
1972 births
Living people
Republican Party members of the Kentucky House of Representatives
People from Grant County, Kentucky
Thomas More University alumni
University of Kentucky alumni
21st-century American politicians